Yevgeni Olegovich Lutsenko (born 25 February 1987) is a Russian professional footballer. He plays as a striker for FC Arsenal Tula.

Club career
He made his debut in the Russian Premier League in 2004 for FC Torpedo Moscow.

On 14 June 2019, he left FC Dynamo Moscow upon the expiration of his contract.

On 16 June 2019, he signed a two-year contract with FC Arsenal Tula.

International career
On 25 August 2020, he was called up for the Russia national football team for the first time for UEFA Nations League games against Serbia and Hungary in September 2020. Later on the same day, he was injured during Arsenal's league game and was not able to join the national team.

Career statistics

References

1987 births
People from Orenburg
Russian people of Ukrainian descent
Sportspeople from Orenburg Oblast
Living people
Russian footballers
Russia under-21 international footballers
Association football forwards
FC Torpedo Moscow players
FC Rostov players
FC Salyut Belgorod players
FC SKA-Khabarovsk players
FC Mordovia Saransk players
FC Dynamo Moscow players
FC Arsenal Tula players
Russian Premier League players
Russian First League players
Russian Second League players